A.L. (Alfred Luther) Brown High School  is a comprehensive public high school in Kannapolis, North Carolina. It is the only high school in the Kannapolis City Schools district as well as the city of Kannapolis.

A.L. Brown was recognized by DPI as a "School of Distinction" under the state's ABC standards for public education for the 2003–2010 school years.

History
During the expansion of the Cannon Mills Corporation during the 1920s, James William Cannon donated a piece of land just east of the town for a school. Central High School would be built in 1924, about the same time, a new Concord High School opened. Later in 1930, Central High School was renamed J. W. Cannon High School, in honor of James William Cannon. In 1933, the school burned down, and was rebuilt in 1934. In 1951, the school was renamed A. L. Brown High School, and the school moved to a new building southeast of the old facility. The former building was converted into a junior high school, under the name Cannon Junior High School.

In 1967, George Washington Carver High School, Kannapolis' former high school for African Americans, merged with the then all-white A. L. Brown High School, as a result of school integration.

Over the course of the schools history, many additions have been built on to A. L. Brown, such as a separate vocational building, as well as a free-standing gymnasium. During the 2006–07 school year, a newer gymnasium facility opened on campus. These free-standing buildings give A. L. Brown its unique character. Instead of a traditional single building like most high schools, Brown has a small, college-like atmosphere with numerous buildings around a central courtyard. All buildings on the campus are built in the Colonial Williamsburg style of architecture. They also are brick with white trim, modeled after most of Kannapolis.

On September 25, 2011, the STEM Academy, designed to resemble the nearby North Carolina Research Campus Core Lab, held its grand opening. The top two floors offer modern science labs, while the second floor will house communication classes. The basement has a health center and an international welcome center.

In March 2012, the Stroup Arts Center opened. This replaced the previous Vocational Building or V-Building. This center also provides an Exceptional Children's Department, Dance Studio, Art Studio, Drafting, Culinary Arts, Foods 1 & 2, Theatre, & ROTC to the students of A. L. Brown High School.

Timeline
1924 – Central High School Opens
1930 – Renamed J. W. Cannon High School
1933 – J. W. Cannon High School burns down because of faulty wiring
1934 – Cannon HS is rebuilt
1950–51 – A. L. Brown High School is constructed 50 yd southeast of Cannon High. Cannon High becomes J. W. Cannon Junior High School.
1957 – An 8-classroom science wing is added to the west end of the main building.
1958 – The W. J. Bullock Physical Education Building is constructed. Kannapolis Memorial Stadium is built and the central courtyard is added.
1967 – The Samuel B. Stroup Vocational Arts Building, The Ruth Coltrane Cannon Musical Education Center and the Administrative Annex is constructed (Now the Central Office)
1967 — A. L. Brown and George Washington Carver High School integrate
April 17, 1974 – Roof Burns; graduation is moved to W. J. Bullock Gymnasium
1976 – The W. J. Bullock Physical Education Building is extensively renovated under the supervision of Coach Bob Boswell.
January 10, 1982 – J. W. Cannon Junior High School burns down. (Fire was caused by accident). Gymnasium, Cafeteria and Home Economics buildings remain.
1991 – Media Center Wing is constructed
1993 – Cafeteria Addition is built
1994 – Main Office Renovated
1995 – Music building roof pitched, W. J. Bullock Gym roof replaced
1995 – An 8-classroom science wing is added to the existing science wing
1997 – Cyber Campus comes online
2003 – Science wing basement is renovated. Becomes the Mathematics wing
2005 – Cannon Cafeteria and Home Economics Building are demolished
2006 – Auxiliary Physical Education Building is constructed and the Auditorium is extensively renovated. An addition is built for the Central Office and the Main Office is renovated
2007 – The Freshman Academy is established
2009 – The Biotech Wing (later called STEM Academy) construction begins
2011 – STEM Academy completed, V-Building renovation begins
2012 – Vocational Building (V-Building) later called Arts Building is renovated

Notable alumni
Aundrae Allison, former NFL wide receiver
Tavis Bailey, discus thrower for the United States at the 2016 Summer Olympics 
Ethan Horton, former NFL tight end and Pro Bowl selection in 1991
Tracy Johnson, former NFL running back
Kameron Marlowe, country music singer-songwriter signed to Sony Music Nashville
Melissa Morrison-Howard, two-time Olympic bronze medalist (100 m hurdles) at the 2000 and 2004 Olympic Games
Mike Morton, former NFL linebacker and Super Bowl XXXIV champion with the Saint Louis Rams
Brandon Parker, current NFL offensive tackle
George Shinn, past owner of the Charlotte Hornets
Lance Smith, former NFL offensive guard
Haskel Stanback, former NFL running back

References

External links
A.L. Brown's Official Website
KannapolisFootball.com

Brown, A. L.
Kannapolis, North Carolina
Schools in Cabarrus County, North Carolina
Educational institutions established in 1924
1924 establishments in North Carolina